Fuller Street is a hamlet in the civil parish of Fairstead and the Braintree District of Essex, England.

The hamlet's public house is the Square and Compasses.
There are two timber framed and plastered Grade II listed houses in Fuller Street: The Herons dating to the 17th century, and The Stores to c.1590.

Location grid

References

External links 

Hamlets in Essex
Braintree District